Ruth Coppinger (born 18 April 1967) is an Irish politician and member of the Socialist Party. She was elected as a Teachta Dála (TD) in the Dublin West constituency in 2014. In the 2016 general election, she ran as a candidate for Anti-Austerity Alliance–People Before Profit and retained her seat in Dáil Éireann until 2020. She failed to retain her seat at the general election in February 2020.

Political career

Coppinger was a member of Fingal County Council for the Mulhuddart local electoral area from 2003 to 2014. She was co-opted to the council in 2003, replacing Joe Higgins. She was elected in 2004 and re-elected in 2009. She was an unsuccessful candidate for the Socialist Party at the 2011 Dublin West by-election.

She later joined party colleague Joe Higgins in the Dáil, as a result of the 2014 by-election in the same constituency. After being elected, she called for a mass campaign of opposition to water charges being implemented by the Fine Gael-Labour Party coalition.

In November 2014, she called for the gradual nationalisation of US multinationals to prevent job losses. In response, Fianna Fáil’s jobs spokesperson Dara Calleary called the idea “reckless and ludicrous”, as it would "place a massive burden on taxpayers and the public finances.".

In September 2015, she joined homeless families from Blanchardstown, in occupying a Nama-controlled property as part of a campaign to raise awareness of the housing crisis. In October 2015, she joined families in their occupation of a show house in her constituency, to protest at the lack of availability of affordable social housing. She has also supported the tenants of Tyrrelstown, who were made homeless when a Goldman Sachs vulture fund sold their houses.

She was re-elected to the Dáil at the 2016 general election, this time under the Anti-Austerity Alliance–People Before Profit banner. On 10 March 2016, at the first sitting of the 32nd Dáil, she nominated Richard Boyd Barrett for the office of Taoiseach, quoting James Connolly from a hundred years previously when she said: "The day has passed for patching up the capitalist system. It must go" and declaring: "We will not vote for the identical twin candidates" of Fine Gael and Fianna Fáil after they "imposed austerity". On 6 April 2016, following the failure of the Dáil to elect a Taoiseach at that first sitting, Coppinger was nominated for the role of Taoiseach, becoming the first female nominee in the history of the state.

In April 2018, in the lead-up to the repeal of the Eighth Amendment, Coppinger along with her colleague Paul Murphy held up a Repeal sign during leader's questions and was reprimanded by the Ceann Comhairle. Coppinger is a vocal advocate for abortion rights in Ireland, and was a founding member of ROSA, a movement for reproductive justice in Ireland. Earlier, in 2016, Coppinger tabled the private members' motion to repeal the 8th amendment.

In November 2018, Coppinger protested in the Dáil against the conduct of a rape trial in Ireland. During the trial, the defence team, as part of their argument that the sex had been consensual, stated that the 17-year-old victim had worn a thong with a lace front. The defendant was subsequently found not guilty. During a sitting of the Dáil, Coppinger held up a similar pair of underwear and admonished the conduct of the trial, suggesting victim-blaming tactics had been used and suggested this was a routine occurrence in Irish courts. She called on the Taoiseach Leo Varadkar to support her party's bill that would increase sex education in Irish schools and provide additional training to the Irish judiciary and jurors on how to handle cases of rape. Varadkar responded that victims should not be blamed for what happens to them, irrespective of how they are dressed, where they are or if they have consumed alcohol.

In 2019 she sponsored a private member's bill – the Domestic Violence (No-contact order) (Amendment) Bill 2019. The bill lapsed with the dissolution of the Dáil and Seanad.

At the general election in February 2020, Coppinger was defeated in the Dublin West constituency. She unsuccessfully contested the 2020 Seanad election for the NUI constituency.

Personal life
Coppinger lives in Roselawn. She is a secondary school teacher. Her eldest brother Eugene Coppinger served on Fingal County Council from 2011 to 2019.

References

External links
Coppinger, Ruth. "Resentment over property tax is palpable", The Irish Times. 14 May 2014

 

1967 births
Living people
People Before Profit–Solidarity TDs
Irish schoolteachers
Irish tax resisters
Local councillors in Fingal
Members of the 31st Dáil
Members of the 32nd Dáil
21st-century women Teachtaí Dála
Politicians from Fingal
Socialist Party (Ireland) TDs
People from Churchtown, Dublin